Ctenophorus gibba, commonly known as the bulldust ground-dragon or gibber dragon, is a species of agamid lizard occurring in the sparsely vegetated gibber plains of northern South Australia.

Description
Adult Gibber dragons range in colour from yellowish-brown to reddish-brown to grey, with dark flecks. They are stout, with a round head, blunt snout, short limbs and tail.

Ecology and behaviour
The Gibber dragon lives in the arid, sparsely vegetated gibber plains of northern South Australia. They bask on low protruding rocks and shelter in burrows dug into the soft soil between rocks.

References

Reptiles described in 1974
Taxa named by Terry Francis Houston
Agamid lizards of Australia
gibba